Delta Force 1 or variant may refer to:

 Delta Force One: The Lost Patrol (2000 film) U.S. action film
 Operation Delta Force (1997 film) a.k.a. "Operation Delta Force 1", first telefilm in a film series
 The Delta Force (film) a.k.a. "Delta Force 1", a 1986 action movie, first in the series
 Delta Force (video game) a.k.a. "Delta Force I", a 1998 video game, first in the series

See also
 Delta (disambiguation)
 Task Force Delta (disambiguation)